How God Made the English was a British documentary series about the English national identity and its history. It was shown on BBC Two and hosted by historian Diarmaid MacCulloch.

Episode list

References

External links
 
 

2012 British television series debuts
BBC television documentaries
English-language television shows